Russy may refer to the following places:

In France

Russy, Calvados, in the Calvados département 
Russy-Bémont, in the Oise département

In Switzerland

Russy, Switzerland, in the Canton of Fribourg